Perth Stadium railway station (officially Perth Stadium Station) is a railway station in Burswood, Western Australia, next to Perth Stadium (known under sponsorship as Optus Stadium). With six platforms, the station is the second largest on the Transperth network, after Perth railway station.

The station only operates on weekends, and before and after events at Perth Stadium. Ordinarily, it is served by Armadale line services, but before and after events, there are special services which run direct for the Fremantle line and Joondalup line.

Description
Perth Stadium station is along the South Western Railway, which links Perth to Bunbury. The northern  of this railway, between Perth and Armadale, is used by Armadale line suburban rail services as part of the Transperth network. The line and the station is owned by the Public Transport Authority (PTA), an agency of the Government of Western Australia.

Perth Stadium station is to the east of Perth Stadium and to the west of the Graham Farmer Freeway, underneath Victoria Park Drive within the Perth suburb of Burswood, Western Australia. Adjacent stations are Claisebrook station to the west and Burswood station to the south-east.

The station has two concourses: the western concourse and the eastern concourse. The western concourse is north-west of Victoria Park Drive, and is only accessible on event days. That concourse is used to access platforms three and four. The eastern concourse is south-east of Victoria Park Drive and can be accessed from the stadium using an underpass under that road. That concourse can be used to access all platforms. Both concourses have stairs and lifts down to ground level, and toilets at their entrance.

The station is designed to move over 28,000 people following an event, nearly half of the stadium's 60,000 person capacity.

The station is listed as an independent access station on the Transperth website as the platform can be accessed using lifts, the platform gap is small, and tactile paving is in place.

History 

On 18 October 2013, Belmont Park railway station was closed to make way for the Perth Stadium railway station.

In October 2014, three parties were shortlisted to bid for the construction of the station:
Brookfield Multiplex/Downer Rail
John Holland
Laing O'Rourke/AECOM

The contract was awarded to Laing O'Rourke/AECOM in March 2015, with a targeted completion date of late 2017.

In January 2015, a 1.4 kilometre section of the line between Goongoongup Bridge and Burswood station was moved closer to the Graham Farmer Freeway to facilitate construction of the station. Construction of the station commenced in August 2015, and was completed in December 2017, before the stadium's opening in January 2018.

The station was announced as complete on 2 December 2017.

Platforms and services

Trains serving Perth Stadium station are operated by Transperth Train Operations, a division of the PTA. The Transperth network consists of five lines plus one spur line: the Armadale line, which has the Thornlie line as a spur, the Fremantle line, the Joondalup line, the Mandurah line, and the Midland line. Each of these lines meet at Perth station.

On weekend days with no events, the station is served by Armadale line services, whereas Thornlie line services skip the station. This means a frequency of four trains per hour during the day, with a lower frequency at night. Perth-bound trains use platforms 1 and 2, and Armadale-bound trains use platforms 5 and 6.

For full capacity events at Perth Stadium, the station is also served by direct services from the Fremantle and Joondalup lines, which operate in addition to regular services along those lines. Fremantle line trains use platform 3 and Joondalup line trains use platform 4. There is also a shuttle which goes from Perth Stadium station to Perth station, which can be used to transfer to and from the Mandurah line, Midland line and the previously mentioned lines. Before events, the station is served by Thornlie line services, but after events, the Thornlie line does not operate, so patrons have to catch the Armadale line to Cannington railway station and then catch a rail replacement bus. Services may vary for events not projected to be full capacity. Prior to the station opening, the proportion of passengers for each line was predicted to be 3,000 for the Armadale line, 2,800 for the Fremantle line, 7,500 for the Joondalup line and 10,700 for the Mandurah line.

Platforms currently in use are as follows:

See also
Perth Stadium bus station

References

External links

 Perth Stadium Station page at the Perth Stadium website

Armadale and Thornlie lines
Burswood, Western Australia
Railway stations in Perth, Western Australia
Railway stations in Australia opened in 2017